The 1994 European Fencing Championships were held in Kraków, Poland. The competition consisted of individual events only.

Medal summary

Men's events

Women's events

Medal table

References 
 Results at the European Fencing Confederation

1994
European Fencing Championships
International fencing competitions hosted by Poland
European Fencing Championships